The submarine base of Saint-Nazaire is one of five large fortified U-boat pens built by Germany during the Second World War in occupied Saint-Nazaire, France.

Construction 
Before the Second World War, Saint-Nazaire was one of the largest harbours of the Atlantic coast of France. During the Battle of France, the German Army arrived in Saint-Nazaire, in June 1940. The harbour was immediately used for submarine operations, with the  arriving as soon as 29 September 1940.

In December, a mission of the Organisation Todt (Oberbauleitung Süd) inspected the harbour to study the possibilities to build a submarine pen invulnerable to air bombing from England. Work soon began under the supervision of engineer Probst.

The selected space was that of the docks and buildings of the Compagnie Générale Transatlantique, which were razed. Building began in February 1941, with pens 6, 7, and 8 completed in June 1941. On 30 June 1941, Vizeadmiral Karl Dönitz formally opened the U-boat pen, with  being the first boat to occupy one of the pens. From July 1941 to January 1942, pens 9 through 14 were built; and between February to June 1942, pens 1 through 5. Work was eventually completed by the building of a tower.

Between late 1943 and early 1944, a fortified lock was built to protect submarines during their transfer from the Loire river and the pens.

History 
The adjacent dry-dock in Saint-Nazaire dock was the target of Operation Chariot, a British commando raid in 1942, the U-boat pens were a secondary target of the raid. The attack successfully disabled the dry-dock by ramming an explosive-filled destroyer into it, and by demolition teams wrecking the pumps and electrical system.

Design 

The roof is dotted with anti-aircraft weaponry, machine guns and mortars.

The base offers 14 submarine pens.

Between pens 5 and 6, and 12 and 13, are two areas giving access to the upper levels of the base.

The base was equipped with 62 workshops, 97 magazines, 150 offices, 92 dormitories for submarine crews, 20 pumps, 4 kitchens, 2 bakeries, two electrical plants, one restaurant and a hospital.

Defence 

On the roof is one completed and one uncompleted M19 Maschinengranatwerfer automatic  mortar bunker.

The Ville-Port 
The zone of the base was abandoned for a long time. In 1994, the municipality of Saint-Nazaire decided to re-urbanise the base, in a project name Ville-Port (lit: "city-harbour").

The base now features several museums, including a mockup of a transatlantic liner called the Escal'Atlantic, and the French submarine Espadon.

See also
 Lorient Submarine Base
 St Nazaire Raid

References

Lars Hellwinkel: Hitler's Gate to the Atlantic - The German naval bases in France 1940–1945. Ch. Links Verlag, Berlin 2012, .
Janusz Piekałkiewicz: Sea War: 1939–1945. Blandford Press, London – New York 1987, .
Clay Blair: Hitler's U-boat War: The Hunters, 1939–1942.

External links
 Saint-Nazaire tourism
 Remnants of the German naval base and how to find it...

Saint-Nazaire
Buildings and structures in Loire-Atlantique
Museums in Loire-Atlantique
Maritime museums in France
German Navy submarine bases